Charles Bliven "Chick" Mason (August 23, 1873 – January 10, 1935) was an American college football player and coach and lawyer. Mason's first coaching job was for Kentucky State College—now known as the University of Kentucky—in 1895, where he posted a record of 4–5. His next job was as the sixth head football coach at Colgate University in Hamilton, New York; he held that position for three seasons, from 1897 until 1898 and again in 1901. His record at Colgate was 9–12–1. He was a member of the Cornell University class of 1895.

Mason played football at Cornell, where he was a teammate of Clint Wyckoff and George P. Dyer. He later practiced law in Utica, New York. Mason died at his home, in Utica, on January 10, 1935.

Head coaching record

References

External links
 

1873 births
1935 deaths
19th-century American people
19th-century players of American football
Colgate Raiders football coaches
Cornell Big Red football players
Kentucky Wildcats football coaches
New York (state) lawyers
People from Norwich, New York
Sportspeople from Utica, New York
Coaches of American football from New York (state)
Players of American football from New York (state)